Yuri Naves Roberto (born October 7, 1989 in Rio Negro), commonly known as Yuri, is a Brazilian footballer who plays as a defensive midfielder.

Honours
CRB
Campeonato Alagoano: 2017

Remo
Campeonato Paraense: 2019

Vila Nova
Campeonato Brasileiro Série C: 2020

References

External links
 Yuri at playmakerstats.com (English version of ogol.com.br)

1989 births
Living people
Brazilian footballers
Brazilian expatriate footballers
Clube Atlético Mineiro players
Boa Esporte Clube players
Goiás Esporte Clube players
Clube Náutico Capibaribe players
Associação Atlética Caldense players
Joinville Esporte Clube players
Clube de Regatas Brasil players
Sampaio Corrêa Futebol Clube players
Botafogo Futebol Clube (SP) players
Mirassol Futebol Clube players
Clube do Remo players
Sociedade Esportiva e Recreativa Caxias do Sul players
Vila Nova Futebol Clube players
Floresta Esporte Clube players
Association football midfielders